The 2000 Orlando mayoral election was held on Tuesday, March 14, 2000, to elect the mayor of Orlando, Florida. Incumbent mayor Glenda Hood was reelected.

Municipal elections in Orlando and Orange County are non-partisan.  Had no candidate received a majority of the votes in the general election, a runoff would have been held between the two candidates that received the greatest number of votes.

Results

References

2000
2000 Florida elections
2000 United States mayoral elections
2000s in Orlando, Florida